Shebli Rural District is in the Central District of Bostanabad County, East Azerbaijan province, Iran. At the census of 2006, its population was 7,674 in 1,955 households; there were 7,530 inhabitants in 2,109 households at the following census of 2011; and in the most recent census of 2016, the population of the rural district was 7,346 in 2,133 households. The largest of its eight villages was Saidabad, with 3,054 people.

References 

Bostanabad County

Rural Districts of East Azerbaijan Province

Populated places in East Azerbaijan Province

Populated places in Bostanabad County